San Francisco subway can refer to
 Muni Metro
 Bay Area Rapid Transit
 Market Street subway